In mathematics, a  greatest common divisor matrix (sometimes abbreviated as GCD matrix) is a matrix.

GCD matrix example

Let  be a set of positive integers.
The LCM matrix  is defined analogously.

The study of GCD type matrices originates from HJS Smith (1875) who evaluated the determinant of certain GCD and LCM matrices. 

Conjectures
Bourque-Ligh Conjecture: Bourque and Ligh (1992) conjectured that the LCM matrix on a GCD-closed set S is nonsingular. This conjecture was shown to be false by Haukkanen, Wang and Sillanpää (1997) and subsequently by Hong (1999). A lattice-theoretic approach is provided by Korkee, Mattila and Haukkanen (2019).

References

 
 
 
 
  

Matrix theory